Artificial pancreas may refer to any of the various technologies that seek to replicate the endocrine functions of the pancreas: 

 Automated insulin delivery systems, the most common meaning of "artificial pancreas" as diabetes mellitus is the most common disease of pancreatic dysfunction
 Pancreatic islet cell replacement technologies, including those designed to eliminate the requirement for immunosuppression in patients who receive islet cell transplants
 Automated glucose clamps